Whitworth Female College was a Methodist women's college in Brookhaven, Mississippi, founded in 1858 by Milton Whitworth.

History
The college was founded in 1858 by Milton J. Whitworth,  opened in 1859, and disestablished in 1984.  It was associated with the Mississippi Methodist Conference until 1938.

During the Civil War the college was used as a Confederate hospital and managed to reopen after the war's end.

In August 1878, local freemasons laid the cornerstone for a new brick building at the college, into which a time capsule was placed.  Both U.S. Senator from Mississippi Lucius Quintus Cincinnatus Lamar II and Jefferson Davis were expected to attend the ceremony but were "unavoidably absent."

In 1925 the College was first accredited by the Southern Association of Colleges and Schools.  In 1928 the College began operation as a two-year institution associated with Millsaps College in Jackson, Mississippi.  In 1938, because of financial difficulties, the board of trustees of the College voted to cease operations and merge the school with Millsaps College.  The city of Brookhaven bought the campus and leased it out to various short-lived colleges between 1941 and 1984, when all educational operations at the location ceased.

In 2003 the state of Mississippi opened the Mississippi School of the Arts on the grounds of the former college.

Vardaman's visit

During his term as Governor of Mississippi (1904-1908), white supremacist politician James Kimble Vardaman, known as the "Great White Chief," spoke at the college and was presented with a bouquet and the following poem:

TO THE "WHITE CHIEFTAIN."
White flowers to our chieftain white,
Brookhaven's daughters send;
To welcome him with glad delight
The Southland's truest friend.
Be not afraid!  Thou white man's chief,
The Anglo-Saxon Race
Has yet to bend its neck beneath
A victor's cruel mace.
The blood is yours on land and sea
Uphold thro' its supremacy.

Notable alumnae
Lulah Ragsdale (1862-1953), poet, novelist and actor 
Nellie Nugent Somerville, first woman elected to the Mississippi Legislature

References

Further reading

Educational institutions established in 1858
Defunct private universities and colleges in Mississippi
Educational institutions disestablished in 1984
Former women's universities and colleges in the United States
1858 establishments in Mississippi
1984 disestablishments in Mississippi
Education in Lincoln County, Mississippi
History of women in Mississippi